Teter-Klyuch (Täterşişmä) is a rural locality (a village) in Podlubovsky Selsoviet, Karaidelsky District, Bashkortostan, Russia. The population was 8 as of 2010. There is 1 street.

Geography 
Teter-Klyuch is located 58 km southwest of Karaidel (the district's administrative centre) by road. Urazayevo is the nearest rural locality.

References 

Rural localities in Karaidelsky District